Boris Vladimirovich Blinov (19 April 1909 – 13 September 1943) was a Soviet and Russian stage and film actor. Honored Artist of the RSFSR (1935).

Personal life 
He was born in Saint Petersburg. In 1929, he became an actor in Bryantsev Youth Theatre.

During the filming of Wait for Me, he contracted typhoid fever. Nevertheless, he continued his work until the filming was done, dying two months before the film's premiere.

Filmography
 Chapaev (1934) – Dmitry Furmanov
 Girl Friends (1935) – injured commissioner
 The Youth of Maxim (1935) – political prisoner (uncredited)
 The Defense of Volotchayevsk (1937) – sailor Bublik
 The Vyborg Side (1939) – Anatoli Zhelezniakov
 Member of the Government (1939) – district committee secretary
 Yakov Sverdlov (1940) – Anatoli Zhelezniakov (uncredited)
 The Girl from Leningrad (1941) – Andrei Morozov
 The Murderers are Coming (1942) – Theo
 The Front (1943) – guard sergeant Ostapenko
 Taxi to Heaven (1943) – colonel Sergeyev
 Wait for Me (1943) – Nikolai Yermolov (final film role)

Bibliography
 Haynes, John. New Soviet Man: Gender and Masculinity in Stalinist Soviet Cinema. Manchester University Press, 2003.

External links

1909 births
1943 deaths
20th-century Russian male actors
Male actors from Saint Petersburg
Honored Artists of the RSFSR
Russian male film actors
Russian male stage actors
Soviet male film actors

Soviet male stage actors
Deaths from typhoid fever